The 1911 Southern Intercollegiate Athletic Association football season was the college football games played by the member schools of the Southern Intercollegiate Athletic Association as part of the 1911 college football season. The season began on September 23.

Edwin Pope's Football's Greatest Coaches notes: "A lightning-swift backfield of Lew Hardage, Wilson Collins, Ammie Sikes, and Ray Morrison pushed Vandy through 1911 with only a 9–8 loss to Michigan." The Atlanta Constitution voted Vanderbilt's the best backfield in the South. Morrison is considered one of the best quarterbacks in Vanderbilt's long history

Regular season

SIAA teams in bold.

Week One

Week Two

Week Three

Week Four

Week Five

Week Six

Week Seven

Week Eight

Week Nine

Week Ten

Week Eleven

Week Twelve

Bowl games

Awards and honors

All-Americans

QB - Ray Morrison, Vanderbilt (HL; COY [hb])

All-Southern team

John Heisman's All-Southern team:

References